Darryl Yap (born January 7, 1987) is a Filipino film director, screenwriter and producer.

Biography

Early life and education
Yap was born in Olongapo, Zambales to his parents who are school teachers. He graduated in Manila's Centro Escolar University with a mass communication degree and later enrolled at the Nanyang Technological University in Singapore to pursue a degree in public administration.

Career
Yap started his directing career with the short film Squatterina that highlighted the similarities between a typical illegal settler in Olongapo and the disciplines of ballet. It was followed by his first full film #Jowable in 2018 which is about a troubled young woman named Elsa (starring Kim Molina) who yearns for a mature and intimate relationship. The film gained mixed reviews from critics.

In May 2020, Yap released a television series entitled Sakristan about two men coming to terms in finding love despite being church servants. He received widespread criticism before the release of Sakristan due to the nature of the title and posters. There were calls online for Sakristan to be cancelled due to its disrespectful and offensive content to the Catholic Church. The series was released through YouTube.

In January 2021, Viva Films released When I Grow Up, I Want to be a Pornstar which Yap wrote and directed. It tells the story of a group of former pornstars gathered to teach an aspiring teen actress on how to be a pornstar, with a cash reward should the actress be launched. The film was prohibited to be shown to the general public by the Movie and Television Review and Classification Board (MTRCB) due to its sexual and explicit content. A sequel titled Pornstar 2: Pangalawang Putok was released on December 3, 2021, on Vivamax.

Yap released another film entitled Gluta in July 2021 about an Aeta girl who dreams of winning the Miss Universe pageant but faces discrimination from people including her own indigenous community. It was followed by a comedy Revirginized in August 2021 about a mother (starring Sharon Cuneta) who never had a proper coming of age experience.

On 2022, Yap directed a fictional drama film entitled Maid in Malacañang which was about the Marcos family's last three days in the Malacañang Palace before they were forced to flee to Hawaii during the People Power Revolution in 1986. Because of its controversial portrayal of the Marcoses and of People Power Revolution figurehead Corazon Aquino, it was dubbed as the most controversial film of the year, receiving numerous negative reviews from critics and audiences. A prequel Martyr or Murderer is slated to release in late February 2023. Isko Moreno will play the role of Ninoy Aquino, while Marco Gumabao, Jerome Ponce and Cindy Miranda will portray the younger versions of Ferdinand Marcos, Ninoy Aquino and Imelda Marcos respectively.

Personal life
Yap is the most polarizing, controversial figure in the Philippine film industry with strong opposing views on LGBT status and the church's teachings, particularly a Roman Catholic. He was declared persona non grata by the Quezon City Council, alongside actress Ai-Ai delas Alas, for an episode of Yap's VinCentiments where the Seal of Quezon City was defaced and Delas Alas portrayed Quezon City mayor Joy Belmonte in a negative way.

Controversies

Sexual assault and pedophilia claims
In 2020, Yap drew controversy for his film Ayudamn, which was condemned on social media for having a remark that was "offensive to single parents". Amidst this, a social media user posted a thread showing supposed screenshots of grooming him when he was 16 years old. The user also claimed that Yap's videographer Vincent Asis also had relationships with minors.

Yap responded to the claim with a similar thread of screenshots, claiming that during the conversations, the user was allegedly telling him that he was a rape victim. He stated that the user had edited and manipulated the screenshots to maliciously portray him as a child groomer.

A user on Facebook had also accused him of perpetuating pedophilia and child abuse amidst the lockdown put in place due to the COVID-19 pandemic. Yap threatened to file legal complaints against the Facebook user for spreading false information against him, asserting that he is not a pedophile nor has abused children.

Yap also drew backlash for an old tweet in 2017 which he stated "". Among them was former Commission on Elections commissioner Rowena Guanzon, who called on the public to boycott Yap's movies and report him to his films' financiers.

Maid in Malacañang

Yap's film, Maid in Malacañang, drew controversy due to several controversial scenes in the fictional historical film. In one scene shown in the film's trailer, Corazon Aquino (portrayed by Giselle Sanchez) was shown telling government forces via telephone to immediately deport the Marcoses from the country while playing mahjong with the Carmelites in Cebu.

The accuracy of the scene was debunked by Corazon Aquino's daughter Kris Aquino for lacking context. Her fan page on Twitter shared an account from former Supreme Court associate justice Cecilia Muñoz-Palma of a phone call between Aquino and United States Ambassador Stephen W. Bosworth. During their conversation, Bosworth informed Aquino that Ferdinand Marcos was ready to leave for exile to the United States but requested to stay for a few days in Paoay. The account stated that Aquino felt pity for Marcos and wanted to grant him the two days' stay against the advice of her companions. In the end, Aquino called Bosworth to inform Marcos that his request would not be granted and should just leave the country. Bosworth called Aquino back to inform her that Marcos had left the country. The account stated that after Aquino informed her companions of the departure of the Marcoses, the room was in celebration while Aquino remained silent.

18th Cinemalaya Philippine Independent Film Festival
Yap was allegedly booed by filmmakers at the 18th Cinemalaya Philippine Independent Film Festival after his name appeared on-screen in the credits of a Cinemalaya film that he helped create. He stated that he was unable to promote the film due to his work on Maid in Malacañang.

Filmography

Featured films

Television series

References

External links

1987 births
Filipino film directors
Filipino Roman Catholics
Filipino television directors
Filipino screenwriters
Living people
Filipino LGBT screenwriters
LGBT film directors
LGBT television directors
People from Olongapo
Tagalog-language writers